Leury José Tejeda Brito, musically known as Chimbala, is a Dominican urban music rapper and singer from Santo Domingo.

Career 
He has been dubbed one of the primary performers of dembow in Latin America. He has collaborated with artists such as El Alfa, Mozart La Para, José Reyes, Don Miguelo, Black Point and La Materalista. He gained fame with the song "Maniquí" calling Farruko attention and doing a remix.

In 2022 he was part of the "Premio Lo Nuestro" stage with the album "Wow BB", along with Natti Natasha and El Alfa.

Chimabala's musical history begins in his neighborhood where he made songs for an album that came out but was not very popular, later with a more established work machinery, Chimbala put the final touches on his album "Chimbala de este lado".

In 2012, Chimbala released the songs "Tu ere un loco" and "Cuenta Conmigo" (with the collaborations of Pablo Piddy and Toxic Crow), among others. In 2014 he released the song “Tu no corre a na”, in response to a song that attacked him from El Alfa.

Chimbala resumed his work in urban music at the end of 2016 with the song "Tamo burlao", a collaboration with his colleague El Fother. Since its launch on October 11, 2016, this song has achieved almost seven million views in just two months on its official YouTube video. At this time he is called by some urban media outlets “The little giant! of urban music. In the words of Chimabal himself, 2016 was a year of a lot of work because he managed to hit several songs, made a video clip, toured several countries, remained popular with the public, and conquered other markets.

January 2017 Chimbala has the singles “To lo gogo” and “Desacatao” playing on the main radio stations in the Dominican Republic, both singles with thousands of visits on the YouTube platform.

At the end of 2017 he released the official video for the song "Bye Bye", which brought him quite a bit of fame, this song was in collaboration with Mozart La Para and Liro Shaq.

On February 2, 2018, he released the official video for “Pocoto” on the YouTube platform. Ten months after its release, it already had more than three million views.

"Maniquí" is the single that has given Chimabala an incredible musical boost to his career, it premiered on May 18, 2018 on his YouTube channel, the video a couple of months after its premiere already had more than 18 million views on its YouTube channel, where you can see some girls performing choreographies in the video, this was produced by the Crea Fama Inc. label. The song has had great fame in Latin America, Miami and in places in Europe such as Spain or Italy.

Another success of Chimbala is the song "Ta Celosos", which has more than five million views on YouTube.

These songs have given Chimbala the formula to become one of the most popular urban songs in 2018, so its national and international acceptance is felt in the music. During this period he commented: "This hit of mine is due to the new fusions and rhythms that I have used in my latest musical productions and that are bearing fruit today," he added. By mid-2018, the company Princesa Films was shooting a film that gave Chimbala the opportunity to reach the big screen called "Calle cul-de-sac".

In mid-2018, the artist Mark B presented the single “Pónmelo a sonar”, in collaboration with Chimbala, which was playing on the radio in the Dominican Republic for several weeks. The song was made by Ramón Estix Taveras Mejía “Nitido en El Nintendo”, under the executive production of Alofoke Music and Bombón Productions. Since its release, this collaboration has been accompanied by a music video directed by X Wayne Liriano, where dances, colors and lights are the fundamental elements of the official video. “Pónmelo a sonar”, becomes part of the repertoire of the interpreter of Mark B, which has several famous songs such as “Pal de candles” and “Playa y arena”.

In January 2019 Chimbala released the song "Colombiana", produced by B-One under the label of La Para Record, belonging to reggaeton player Mozart La Para, that same month he released the song "El Pito Remix Internacional", as well as performed a series of nightclub performances during this time.

References 

1991 births
Living people
People from Santo Domingo
Dominican Republic rappers
Dominican Republic songwriters